Det ender med bryllup (It Ends with a Wedding) is a 1943 Danish comedy film directed by Lau Lauritzen Jr. and starring Poul Reumert.

Cast
 Poul Reumert - Fabrikant Steen Andersen
 Berthe Qvistgaard - Rideskolelæreinde Grethe Mikkelsen
 Ib Schønberg - Propagandachef Ib Holm
 Poul Reichhardt - Reklamefuldmægtig Poul Hammer
 Povl Wøldike - Sekretær Jørgensen
 Charles Wilken - Andersen
 Susanne Friis - Fru Andersen
 Knud Heglund - Hovmester Thomsen
 Sigurd Langberg - Berider Mikkelsen
 Henry Nielsen - Staldknægten Herluf
 Anita Prülaider - Irene
 Preben Kaas - Piccolo
 Poul Petersen

External links

1943 films
1940s Danish-language films
1943 comedy films
Danish black-and-white films
Films directed by Lau Lauritzen Jr.
ASA Filmudlejning films
Danish comedy films